Events from the year 1863 in art.

Events
 March – American-born painter James McNeill Whistler settles close to the River Thames in Chelsea, London, where he will live for most of the rest of his life.
 June 12 – The Arts Club is founded by Charles Dickens, Anthony Trollope, Frederic Leighton and others in London's Mayfair as a social meeting place for those involved or interested in the creative arts.
 The École des Beaux-Arts in Paris becomes independent of the Académie des Beaux-Arts.
 Julia Margaret Cameron takes up photography.
 Alexander Gilchrist's Life of William Blake, "Pictor Ignotus" is published in London, edited posthumously by Anne Gilchrist.

Exhibitions
 May 17 – Opening of first exhibition of the Salon des Refusés in Paris (in which Manet exhibits Le déjeuner sur l'herbe and two other paintings; Whistler exhibits Symphony in White, No. 1: The White Girl and Cézanne first exhibits), and coining of the term avant-garde.

Works
 Peter Nicolai Arbo – Horse Herd on the High Mountains
 Thomas Jones Barker – 'The Secret of England's Greatness' (Queen Victoria presenting a Bible in the Audience Chamber at Windsor) (approximate date)
 Albert Bierstadt – The Rocky Mountains, Lander's Peak
 David Gilmour Blythe
 Libby Prison
 Man Eating in a Field
 Alexey Bogolyubov – Easter procession in Yaroslavl
 Alexandre Cabanel – The Birth of Venus (first version, Musée d'Orsay, Paris)
 Paul Cézanne – The Judgement of Paris (approximate date)
 Charles Camille Chazal – Institution of the Eucharist
 François-Claudius Compte-Calix – 
 Pierre Puvis de Chavannes – Work (Musée de Picardie, Amiens)
 Joseph Durham – Memorial to the Great Exhibition, London
 Thomas Charles Farrer – A Buckwheat Field on Thomas Cole's Farm
 Jozef Israëls – Fishermen's Children (first version)
 Italian – The Veiled Nun (marble bust, approximate date)
 Vilhelm Kyhn –  ("After Sunset on the Outskirts of a Village")
 Édouard Manet
 Le déjeuner sur l'herbe ("The Luncheon on the Grass" or "The Picnic") (Musée d'Orsay, Paris)
 Olympia (Musée d'Orsay, Paris)
 Robert Braithwaite Martineau – The Last Chapter
 Jean-Louis-Ernest Meissonier – Napoleon III at the Battle of Solferino
 John Everett Millais – My First Sermon
 Albert Joseph Moore – Wall decorations at Coombe Abbey
 Elisabet Ney – Eilhard Mitscherlich (sculpture)
 Vincent Pilz – Pegasus (pair of bronzes) (approximate date)
 Dante Gabriel Rossetti – Joan of Arc Kissing the Sword of Deliverance
 Eugene von Guerard – North-east View from the Northern Top of Mount Kosciusko
 Frederick Walker – The Lost Path
 James McNeill Whistler – Grey and Silver: Old Battersea Reach

Births
 January 11 – Mary Tannahill, American painter and artist in fabrics (died 1951)
 January 29 – Suzette Holten, née Skovgaard, Danish painter and ceramist (died 1937)
 April 3 – Henry van de Velde, Belgian painter, architect and designer, co-founder of the Art Nouveau movement (died 1957)
 May 17 – C. R. Ashbee, English designer (died 1942)
 June 12 – Bertram Mackennal, Australian sculptor (died 1931)
 June 16 – Arturo Michelena, Venezuelan painter (died 1898)
 June 21 – Anne Marie Carl-Nielsen, née Brodersen, Danish sculptor (died 1945)
 June 27 – Henri Beau, Canadian Impressionist painter (died 1949)
 August 30 (August 18 Old Style) – Sergey Prokudin-Gorsky, Russian color photographer (died 1944)
 September 6 – Jessie Willcox Smith, American illustrator (died 1935)
 October 24 – Bertha Jaques, American etcher (died 1941)
 November 11 – Paul Signac, French neo-Impressionist painter (died 1935)
 December 5 – George Pirie, Scottish painter (died 1946)
 December 12 – Edvard Munch, Norwegian painter (died 1944)

Deaths
 January 6 – Harriet Gouldsmith, English landscape painter and etcher (born 1787)
 January 17 – Horace Vernet, French painter of battles, portraits, and Orientalist Arab subjects (born 1789)
 February 6 – Karl Ludwig Frommel, German landscape painter and engraver (born 1789)
 February 16 – Alvan Fisher, American pioneer in landscape painting and genre works (born 1792)
 February 20 – John Cart Burgess, English watercolour painter of flowers and landscapes (born 1798)
 April 4 – Ludwig Emil Grimm, German painter and engraver (born 1790)
 June 5 – Marie Ellenrieder, German painter (born 1791)
 July 7 – William Mulready, Irish genre painter of rural scenes (born 1786)
 July 12 – Étienne-Jean Delécluze, French painter and critic (born 1781)
 August 13 – Eugène Delacroix, French Romantic painter (born 1798)
 September 19 – Joseph Nigg – Austrian painter, with painting on porcelain a specialty (born 1782)
 December 4 – James Duffield Harding, English landscape painter (born 1798)
 December 10 – Charles C. Ingham, Irish portrait painter and founder of the New York National Academy of Design (born 1797)
 December 27 – Maria Martin, American watercolor painter (born 1796)
 date unknown
 Tommaso Benedetti, Austrian painter (born 1797)
 Per Krafft the Younger, Swedish portrait and historical painter (born 1777)
 Nukina Kaioku, Japanese painter and calligrapher (born 1778)
 Johannes Baptista van Acker, Flemish portrait miniature painter (born 1794)

 
Years of the 19th century in art
1860s in art